Trinity University Press is a university press affiliated with Trinity University, which is located in San Antonio, Texas. Trinity University Press was officially founded in 1967 after the university acquired the Illinois-based Principia Press. This iteration of the press closed in 1989; the press was then revived in 2002.

In addition to the main university press name, the press also issues books through the Trinta Books, Terra Firma, Maverick, and ArteKids publishing imprints. Trinity University Press is currently a member of the Association of University Presses.

See also

 List of English-language book publishing companies
 List of university presses

References

External links 
Trinity University Press

Trinity University Press
Texas